Gulzar-e-Hijri is a neighborhood in the Karachi East district of Karachi, Pakistan. It was previously administered as part of the Gulshan Town borough, which was disbanded in 2011. 

Under the new local government system, Gulzar-e-Hijri lies in the District East. A large part of Gulzar e Hijri is along the Karachi - Hyderabad (M-9) Motorway.

Schools and Colleges
 Dow College of Pharmacy 
 Dow International Medical College 
 Kiran Hospital Kiran Hospital www.kpws.org

See also 

 Gulshan-e-Iqbal
 Gulistan-e-Johar
 Gulzar-e-Hijri

References

External links 
 Karachi Website.
 Gulberg Town.

Neighbourhoods of Karachi
Gulshan Town